The Entrepotdoksluis (bridge no. 80) is a bridge in Amsterdam-Centrum that crosses a lock by the same name.

Location

The bridge is located in the Hoogte Kadijk and spans the north side of the Entrepotdoksluis (a canal lock), which leads from the Entrepotdok to the Nieuwe Vaart. 
The bridge has been a rijksmonument (national monument) since 2001. 
The bridge gave access to the Entrepotdok, an inland port built in 1827 where imported goods were stored until the import duties were paid.

Background

The current Entrepotdoksluis (lock) was opened in 1840. 
A double wooden drawbridge was then built over it. 
As shipping was still busy, the bridge could not be replaced by a fixed bridge when it was repaired. 
In around 1902, the municipality opted for an iron / steel drawbridge. 
In September 1902 the first tender was made, 16 m³ of granite had to be delivered this bridge. 
According to the Monuments Register and Frank V. Smit, the bridge was built in 1903.

Design

The monuments register described the bridge in August 2017 as follows: a single seesaw or drawbridge with passage, designed by the Public Works Department. 
It has abutments made of brick and dimension stone, a frame with simple steel girders and a (still) partially wooden bridge deck. 
The frame and balance are made of riveted steel with half-timbering. 
The lifting cables are also made of steel. 
The movement work is performed in a quadrant. 
In contrast to many steel bridges, the balustrades are made of decorative ironwork.

History

The bridge was made by Werkspoor op Oostenburg. 
In 1911 the controls were given electric power with a drive from the NB Haarlemsche Machinefabriek v / h / Gebr. Figee. 
Some repair work had to be done in 1936, but the bridge actually did its job perfectly since its placement. 
However, today the bridge is controlled in the same way as the adjacent bridge 327, which resulted in a saving on the lubrication frequency from 10 times a month to once every quarter.

According to Smit van Wichert, the designer was Arend de Graaf and belongs to his first generation of drawbridges. 
Very few of them are left, because they became outdated, and also looked somewhat crude. 
In the years following construction of this bridge, De Graaf's drawbridges became somewhat more ornate, so the movement work became open (it is closed at bridge 80). 
It was not until 1915 that the definitive De Graaf drawbridge took its shape under the influence of structural engineer Adriaan Dwars. 
The end result of all improvements can be found in bridge 307, the result of a collaboration with Piet Kramer.

See also 
Canals of Amsterdam

Notes

Sources

Bruggen van Amsterdam
Frank V. Smit, Bruggen in Amsterdam, Matrijs 2008
Monumentenregister, geraadpleegd 12 augustus 2017

Bridges in Amsterdam
Bascule bridges